Llanelli won the third and final Welsh-Scottish League.

2001–2002 League Table

The top 5 Welsh teams plus Glasgow and Edinburgh qualified for next season's Heineken Cup. At the end of this season Glasgow Warriors and Edinburgh Rugby left the Scottish-Welsh League; making the 2002–03 a nine team Welsh Premier Division. The bottom side Caerphilly thus avoided regulation.

Results

With 11 teams in the league it was impossible to have an even round system where each team played one another in a weekend. (One team would always have to sit out.)

The fixture list was instead devised so that teams would fulfil their fixtures in weekend or mid-week slots.

Each team would play 20 rounds in total.

The first 4 or 5 rounds for each club were hosted jointly by the Celtic League (dependent on which Celtic League pool those teams were in).

Welsh-Scottish and Celtic League fixtures

These rounds counted both for the Welsh-Scottish League and for the Celtic League.

Pool A of the Celtic League had 8 teams, Pool B had 7 teams in total. Of that, Pool A had 6 Scottish-Welsh teams and Pool B had 5 Scottish-Welsh teams.

Thus Scottish and Welsh teams of Pool A had 5 matches against one another. Scottish and Welsh teams of Pool B had 4 matches against one another.

These matches were played first in allocated slots.

Slot 1

Slot 2

Slot 3

Slot 4

Slot 5

Slot 6

Slot 7

After 7 slots, each team had now played 4 or 5 rounds (depending on whether they were in Celtic League Pool A or B).

The remaining slots and rounds played were purely for the Welsh-Scottish League.

Welsh-Scottish League fixtures

Slot 8

Slot 9

Slot 10

Slot 11

Slot 12

Slot 13

Slot 14

Slot 15

Slot 16

Slot 17

Slot 18

Slot 19

Slot 20

Slot 21

Slot 22

Slot 23

Slot 24

Slot 25

Slot 26

Slot 27

Slot 28

Slot 29

References

2001–02
2001–02 in Scottish rugby union
2001–02 in Welsh rugby union
2001–02 in British rugby union
2001–02 in European rugby union leagues